Castro de Avelãs is a civil parish in the municipality of Bragança, Portugal. The population in 2011 was 460, in an area of 13.48 km².

References

Parishes of Bragança, Portugal